Compromised: Counterintelligence and the Threat of Donald J. Trump is a New York Times and Washington Post best-selling non-fiction book by Peter Strzok, released by Houghton Mifflin Harcourt in September 2020, that describes Strzok's role as Deputy Assistant Director of the FBI counterintelligence division during the investigation of the Donald J. Trump presidential administration.  Strzok's investigation examined the administration as a possible source of Russian misinformation that furthered Russian interests prior to, during, and after the 2016 Presidential election.

Sources within the administration that were believed to have received and been aware of Russian efforts to provide damaging information about presidential opponent Hillary Clinton to the 2016 Trump campaign were also investigated, as was Clinton's placement and partial deletion of confidential e-mails on her personal server, an action not found to have been a crime by Strzok's FBI investigation as it was found she had not acted with criminal intent.

Synopsis

Peter Strzok had spent twenty years working with the FBI as a counterintelligence officer defending the United States against threats from foreign governments.  In August 2018, though he had risen to the office of Deputy Assistant Director of the FBI's counterintelligence division, and was a recipient of the FBI's highest investigative honor, the Director's Award for Excellence, the Trump administration forced him out of the Bureau when he used several personal texts to express what he believed to be his private political opinions and views on the Trump administration in a manner that offended Donald Trump and ignited a storm of conservative media.  During his investigation, Strzok became convinced that the President was under the influence of Vladimir Putin and/or representatives of the intelligence forces he controlled from the Kremlin.

In Compromised, Strzok uses his decades of experience with the FBI to build a striking description of the potential for foreign influence at the apex of American government and power.  And he asked a question that should concern every American, but that many may find controversial, Did the President put Russian interests as they represented his personal and/or financial goals ahead of American interests, and in so doing threaten national security?

Despite Trump and conservative media's accusation of widespread bias steering the nature of the counterintelligence investigation as a result of his ill-advised texts criticizing Trump, Strzok noted that the Department of Justice's Inspector General (IG) ruled "there was no evidence that any investigative act was ruled by bias --".  Though Strzok noted, "the damage was done".  Despite the IG's ruling, Trump would Tweet, "Peter Strzok is a fraud, as is the rigged investigation he started."

Strzok served with special counsel
Strzok also served on special counsel Robert Mueller's investigative team until the Justice Department inspector general flagged critical text messages about President Trump that Mr. Strzok had sent and received during the 2016 campaign. Probably most damaging was a text he sent to co-worker Lisa Page, with whom he was conducting an affair outside his marriage.  Strzok thoughtlessly sent Page the following consoling text to mediate her concern that Trump might win the election, “No. No he won’t. We’ll stop it.” This type of contact with the outside world is forbidden when serving with the FBI, but would be considered free speech as a private citizen.  As a partial defense, Strzok noted that "Bureau policy allowed personal use of FBI smartphones, and most everyone I knew in the Bureau used their work phones to text or email friends and family...."

The impact of Strozok's thoughtless text was greatly compounded by the fact that both he and Page were working for the Bureau, that the text soon went public, and that the Republican party was on the cusp of a close and contentious election.  Many believed the President and fellow Republicans overreacted to Strzok's blunder, as Trump once recklessly alleged Strzok and others in the FBI had plotted against his campaign and had even committed treason, though treason can be committed only by aiding an enemy of the United States such as Russia, not by offending a private American citizen, including the President.  Strzok filed a suit in August 2019 against the Bureau claiming that they caved against "unrelenting pressure" from the Trump administration, and that he was "unfairly punished" for expressing his political opinions.

Trump as a possible source of counterintelligence
Intelligence is defined as the use of foreign agents, such as Donald Trump and his administration, to push the political objectives of a country, in this instance Russia, a foreign nation in several ways hostile to and in competition with American financial and military interests.  Counterintelligence is the effort to expose and stop the Russians in this effort.  In Compromised, Strzok wrote that Trump most appeared to be a possible object or source of Russian intelligence due to his and his administrations following stands:

Advancing Kremlin line
According to Strzok, Trump's behavior may have advanced the Kremlin line.  Though his stated motives were to cut American spending, early in his administration Trump questioned America's participation in the North Atlantic Treaty Organization (NATO) and America's engagement in Western Europe, both of which have been seen by our allies as essential for their military protection from Russian expansion, including Russia's current interest in the Crimea and the Ukraine that in 2020 became a full scale invasion.  Though previously approved by the Senate, Trump's refusal to give roughly ten million in military aid to the Ukrainian Prime Minister before he promised to investigate the alleged financial corruption of Hunter Biden, son of 2020 political opponent Joe Biden, may be seen to have temporarily benefitted the objectives of Russia in their military struggle against Ukraine and the Crimea.  The aid was not provided to the Ukraine until Congress stepped in.

Stating there was no Russian interference
Prior to the 2016 election, and during his debates with Hillary Clinton, Trump advanced the theory that someone or some country other than Russia may have interfered with the 2016 election, despite James Comey's and later Robert Mueller's investigation clearly specifying the scope of Russia's interference in the election and Mueller's subsequent 2018 report that concluded and detailed the same.  Trump's view that there was no Russian interference in the 2016 election was shared by Vladimir Putin, the Kremlin, and cable TV's Russia Today, a network under the influence of the Kremlin.  Though American intelligence, particularly the findings of the Mueller investigation, later boldly conflicted with the stated view of the Kremlin in this instance, the Trump administration had made a statement that agreed with the Kremlin line.  Even prior to Trump's inauguration in January 2017, on December 29, 2016, the Obama administration had sanctioned Russia for what American intelligence sources strongly concluded to be election interference.  Despite the nature of the sanctions specifically stating concern about Russia's election interference, Michael Flynn, Trump's National Security Adviser, indicated to Russian Ambassador Sergey Kislyak the following day in a taped conversation, that Trump would likely ease the sanctions once in office.  According to the testimony of Michael Cohen and other sources, Trump had his own financial interests in Russia and had formerly signed a letter of intent to develop the building provisionally named Trump World Tower Moscow, in October 2015, long before Flynn discussed the possibility of easing economic sanctions.  Cohen maintained that he continued to take calls to obtain funding for the project the following year.

Use of questionable information
The Trump administration and other sources spread the theory that the "Steele dossier", a privately initiated and funded investigation largely of Russian influence in Donald Trump's 2016 campaign by a British intelligence officer, had initiated the American FBI's Russia investigation, and that the Steele Dossier was entirely false.  Both statements were untrue according to Strzok and supported by the Mueller investigation.  Strzok's investigation found that the Steele Dossier, though it contained useful information, "had very little to do with the bulk of the (Russia) investigation" conducted by Robert Mueller. According to Strzok, in his investigation of the Steele Dossier, which described several aspects of the Trump administration's working with Russian intelligence, "some things we could corroborate, a lesser number we could show were inaccurate, and with the vast majority we just couldn't say".  Nonetheless, according to Strzok, the intelligence from Steele spawned numerous false conspiracy theories attempting to deliberately confuse the narrative, some coming from Russian trolls, and "sad to say the President himself".  One of these conspiracy theories falsely claimed Joseph Mifsud was controlled and manipulated by the FBI.  Mifsud was a Maltese Foreign minister, whom Trump campaign aid George Papadopoulos named as the source of the information that the Russians were sending dirt on Hillary Clinton to the Trump campaign, a claim found to in many ways be accurate by the Mueller investigation.

Another controversial theory widely distributed by the Trump administration and diverse media, which is still believed by many today, involved the use of a wiretap that "was installed at Trump Tower to spy on the campaign", likely by Obama and the Democratic opposition.  According to Strzok and other FBI sources, "it wasn't".  In early June 2018, as detailed by Strzok, a fringe "news" website claimed that "the FBI had "initiated multiple spies in the Trump campaign in 2015".   Though this was inaccurate according to the FBI, Trump tweeted about it claiming "a counter-intelligence operation into the Trump campaign dating way back to December 2015.  Spygate is in full force!  Is the Mainstream Media interested yet?  Big stuff!"  According to FBI manager Strzok, this claim was "in fact wildly false", as the FBI determined they had not investigated Trump in 2015, nor installed a wiretap in Trump tower.

Election interference may have been invited
In July 2016, Trump made a televised statement which requested that Russia hack Hillary Clinton's email, though it required illegally breaking into the Democratic National Committee's private server, and though according to the FBI, the request itself was illegal as it sought foreign aid to benefit a particular candidate in an election.  As noted by Strzok, according to the Mueller report, people connected to Trump's campaign coordinated with WikiLeaks to expedite the release of email stolen by the Russian's to help his campaign, including the Clinton's emails.  Trump's repeated accusations in the summer of 2016 that Clinton had committed a crime for which she should be imprisoned (putting confidential emails on a private server), (though Clinton was never found guilty of a crime after Strzok's thorough FBI investigation) likely damaged Clinton's support from the American electorate.

Trump Jr. may have solicited Russian interference
On June 9, 2016, Donald Trump Jr., and Paul Manafort, met with Rob Goldstone, a British tabloid journalist and several Russians including Natalia Vesselnitskaya, a Kremlin-connected lawyer.  Trump Jr. claimed that Russian adoption of children was the primary topic of discussion.  However, other topics may have been discussed, and only a month later in July, Donald Trump Jr. released on Twitter a series of email messages that included an exchange where Rob Goldstone, who had requested the Trump Tower meeting on June 7, 2016, offered to "provide the Trump campaign with some official documents and information that would incriminate Hillary", which contained very "high level and sensitive information but is part of Russia and its government's support for Mr. Trump".  In what many in the FBI, including Strzok, believed to have been soliciting the Russians to send compromising information, Trump Jr. responded, "If its what you say I love it, especially later in the summer".  The email had clearly stated that the damaging information on Hillary Clinton was being provided by the Russian government, a conceivable violation of campaign law that prevents receiving opposition research or other political aid from a foreign country.

Accusing Clinton of a crime
Though not asserted by Strzok, one might speculate Trump's statements in the summer of 2016 accusing Clinton of a crime for her use of confidential emails could have been responsible for a drop of roughly 1% of her National support in the polls.  This would have significantly influenced the outcome of the historically close 2016 election.  That James Comey admitted publicly to reopening the investigation of Clinton's emails, in an ill-advised press conference only a few days before the election may also have led to a significant drop in Clinton's polling, and may have furthered the objectives of the Russian GRU who, according to the Mueller investigation, had hacked the e-mails months earlier before they found their way to WikiLeaks, a publication that made such information available to the public.  When the FBI investigation under Strzok concluded that nothing was criminal in Clinton's actions, the Trump campaign made no reference to the statement, nor retracted their assertion that Clinton had committed a crime, rather repeatedly pushing the line that though found innocent of a crime, Clinton had gotten a "sweet" deal from the FBI.

Appearing to deny business dealings with Russia
On January 10, 2017, Buzzfeed first published some of the Steele dossier online.  Misleadingly, considering he was simultaneously conducting business for a Trump Tower to be built in Moscow, Trump tweeted, "I HAVE NOTHING TO DO WITH RUSSIA -- NO DEALS, NO LOANS, NO NOTHING!"

Misleading statements by Sessions
That same week, Trump appointee Attorney General Jeff Sessions, in his confirmation hearings erroneously claimed "I have been called a surrogate at a time or two in that campaign (2016) and I didn't have--did not have communications with the Russians, and I'm unable to comment on it."  Not long after Sessions recused himself from all aspects of the Russian investigation after evidence was shown that he'd had at least two meetings with Russians, both strongly suspected of having ties to the Kremlin, during the campaign.  Though a staunch and longtime Trump supporter, Sessions was later fired by Trump, for what many, including Strzok, believe was his reticence to put pressure on Mueller and the direction of the Russia investigation.

Removing Russian sanctions

On December 29, 2016, prior to the inauguration, Trump's National Security Adviser Michael Flynn spoke twice by phone with Russian diplomat Sergai Kislyak, and it was recorded on tape that he had discussed the possibility of relaxing the economic sanctions imposed by President Obama against Russia.  The discussion might be considered of questionable legality as Trump did not yet formally hold office, and the 1799 Logan Act forbid non-government entities from conducting foreign negotiations on behalf of the United States. Relaxing sanctions aroused more suspicion by certain members of Strzok's FBI investigation because the action conflicted with a standing policy of the reigning Presidential administration, and because the Trump administration was known to have economic and political ties with Russia through the previous actions of campaign manager Paul Manafort to elect a Ukrainian President sympathetic to Russian interests, and Trump's ongoing negotiations to obtain a Trump Tower in Moscow.

Perhaps most importantly, Obama's sanctions were primarily a response to Putin and Russia's interference in the 2016 election which most analysts clearly believed benefitted the Trump campaign, a fact Trump party loyalists never mentioned.  Strzok and members of his investigative team believed the discussion of Trump's intent to remove such sanctions may have signaled to many in Russian intelligence that their interference in America's future elections, the cornerstone of American Democracy, would be tolerated by the United States.  Flynn covered his oversight by denying he had discussed sanctions in a statement to vice-president elect Pence, and when his lie was discovered, he was fired from office.

In his professional role as an FBI investigator, Strzok speculated Trump himself had ordered Flynn to discuss the removal of sanctions as it was Trump's formerly stated intent to do so. As National Security Adviser, Flynn had the highest security clearance available, another reason why all his actions with regards to Russia, already a military adversary of the United States in the Crimea, would need to be met with considerable caution, and watched carefully by American intelligence.  The Trump administration had previously discussed the possibility of removing economic sanctions on Russia, an action that Strzok believed could possibly be interpreted as an attempt to align themselves with the objectives of wealthy Russian oligarchs and the Russian government under Putin.

Contacts with Russian intelligence
At and shortly before the 2016 inauguration, unknown to the American public, Strzok noted that the following four Russians were in Washington, all of whom had links to Russian government or intelligence.  Vekselberg and Kilimnik had or would soon meet with members of the 2016 Trump campaign with what many believed to be the intent of influencing the election:

Viktor Vekselberg, a Ukrainian-born Russian industrialist with close ties to Putin, who was sanctioned by the United States in 2018 during the Trump administration.

Natalia Veselnitskaya, a Russian government-linked attorney, who had already attempted to pedal dirt on Hillary Clinton to Trump aids in a June 2016 meeting at Trump Tower.

Maria Butina, a gun's rights advocate, later convicted of being an unregistered Russian foreign agent.

Konstantin Kilimnik, Manafort's former employer who according to the FBI had close ties to Russian intelligence and the GRU.  Both Manafort and Rick Gates had met with Kilimnik on several occasions, providing him with critical poling data on the battleground states in the 2016 election.  Viktor Yanukovych, a 2010 Ukrainian President of Russian birth was accused of corruption and voting fraud during his administration.  After fleeing the Ukraine for Russia in 2014, Yanukovych was accused of "mass killings of civilians" by his successor.  Yanukovych was backed by Russia in 2010 and Manafort had played an important role in managing his campaigns with the aid of Kilimnik.  Manafort was well aware that Yanukovych had imprisoned one of his former political opponents, and some speculate the action may have inspired him to encourage the Trump campaign to suggest the same for opponent Hillary Clinton in Trump's 2016 presidential campaign. Yanukovych was strongly backed by Eastern Ukraine, a region that was close to Russia both geographically and politically.  Russia needed Ukraine to transport its oil and gas to Europe, but Ukraine depended on Russia for nearly all of its energy needs.  According to Strzok, under Yanukovych, a leader who never had American support, Russia enjoyed de facto control of Ukraine, and funneled him millions in bribes to control his favor.

Also present was Sergei Millian, a U.S. citizen of Belarusian descent, who had attempted to land a job with Trump campaign aid George Papadopoulos.  Strzok's investigations led to charging Papadopoulos with having lied to the FBI about the timing and extent of his contact with a professor who promised to connect him to high Russian officials.  Papadopoulos was one of the first Trump campaign aids to be investigated. After serving only twelve days in jail, he later wrote a book claiming Strzok's investigation was part of a conspiracy to depose Trump.  Perhaps following Papadopoulos's lead, Trump and diverse media would eventually have success claiming Strzok's counterintelligence investigation was also a conspiracy to depose Trump, and variously an act of treason, a deep state looking to destroy Trump, or a coup to depose Trump.

Authoritarian regimes
From his early life experiences Strzok made the following observations about authoritarian regimes and dictators:

"Authoritarian regimes desire to manipulate control, or discredit media.  A relentless distortion of reality numbs a country's populace to outrage and weakens its ability to discern truth from fiction".

"Dictators secure power and legitimacy by co-opting the power of the state - its military, law enforcement, and judicial systems - to carry out personal goals and vendettas rather than the nation's needs."

"Dictators secure power by undermining dissent, questioning the validity of opposition and refusing to honor public will, up to and including threatening or preventing the peaceful transfer of power."

Strzok observed that attempts to discredit media could be attributed to Trump's accusing the American press of being an "enemy of the people", and his frequently labeling well-researched media reports from a multitude of newspapers, including the award-winning The New York Times and The Washington Post, as "fake news".

Strzok oberved that Trump's reliance on his carefully selected attorney general, William Barr, head of the Justice Department, to mold the public's perceptions of the Mueller report, above the protests of its chief prosecutor Andrew Weissmann, and its special counsel former FBI director Robert Mueller, could be viewed as an attempt to co-opt the power of the justice system by appointing an attorney general whom he knew in advance would likely protect his administration from criticism, investigation, or indictment by the FBI. And most significantly, though Strzok's book was published months before the election, Trump's refusal to concede the presidency to President-elect Joseph Biden after the 2020 election and his legally questionable use of the courts to further this goal could be seen as an attempt to prevent the peaceful transfer of power, partly by co-opting the power of the judicial system. By  influencing Republican election officials in battleground states to make pointless recounts or delay the final certification of votes due to what American courts repeatedly ruled as evidence-less claims of fraud, Trump could be seen as attempting to co-opt the power of election officials, and the rightful power of the American electorate in a Democracy.  When Attorney General Barr, leader of the Justice Department, made a statement after the 2020 election that he believed widespread voter fraud had not occurred in the 2020 election, Trump pressured him to resign.  An argument could be made that this action  again coopted the power of the American judicial system.

Critical reviews
Carlos Lozada of The Washington Post gave a favorable review, of a "compelling tale" but criticized the strength of Strzok's bias against Trump in some instances.  Strzok considers Trump a liar who presided over a “heap of perfidy and treachery,” a leader “gleefully wreaking havoc on America’s political institutions and norms.  But Lozada noted importantly that Strzok's description of Trump's being "compromised", did "not mean that the president received regular orders from Russia" or that he did Putin's bidding at Putin's immediate request. Rather, Strzok writes, that “The compromised liar need not be told what to do, It all unspools without anyone’s ever having to say a word.” Trump's extramarital affairs, his issues with his charitable Trump foundation, and his own questionable financial background, particularly the strong suspicion of tax evasion, also compromise him “badly and in a myriad of ways,” Strzok contends. And, in turn, a compromised president pursued policies and adopted positions that Strzok sees as “highly suspicious, highly consistent, and highly advantageous to America’s historic adversary (Russia).”  Strzok, according to Lozada, still considered Trump's criminality as a grey area, however this view may be open to debate.  When asked by Robert Mueller if Trump's behavior warranted a conspiracy, Lozada noted Strzok replied "I was skeptical that all the different threads amounted to anything more than bumbling incompetence,”.  Strzok wrote “In my view they (Trump's staff) were most likely a collection of grifters pursuing individual personal interests.”

Nicholas Fandos of The New York Times praised the book, and wrote "A former Army officer, Mr. Strzok . . . rose quickly through [the FBI’s] ranks, earning a reputation within the bureau as one of its most savvy and reliable counterintelligence agents.”

James Traub of The Atlantic strongly praised Strzok's sense of duty in conducting his counterintelligence investigation of Trump.  Traub criticized congressional Republicans for attempting to use Strzok's extramarital affair with Lisa Page and poorly timed text as a way of destroying his credibility, while overlooking the relevance and importance of his investigation and service to his country.  Traub wrote "Peter Strzok stands for an FBI that, whatever its faults, serves the nation rather than a political master".  When asked by Texas Congressman Ted Poe in a congressional oversight hearing how he could conduct an honest and unbiased investigation after texting that he would stop Trump from winning the election, Strzok replied “A judge asks jurors, ‘Are you able to set aside your personal opinions and render a judgment based on the facts?’ and I and the men and women of the FBI every day take our personal beliefs and set them aside in vigorous pursuit of the truth wherever it lies.”  Despite his FBI award and twenty years of exceptional service to the Bureau, the congressman replied to Strzok, "I don't believe you".

The more politically conservative Lloyd Green of the Guardian, who did opposition research for the political campaign of George H. W. Bush in 1988, also considered the book "compelling reading", and observed Strzok's discovery of Trump's “willingness to accept political assistance from an opponent like Russia – and it follows, his willingness to subvert everything that America stands for.”  He notes that Strozok believed "Our investigations revealed Donald Trump’s willingness to further the malign interests of one of our most formidable adversaries, apparently for his own personal gain.”  Very strong statements, yet fairly credible ones according to the more politically conservative Green. Green doles out some criticism of the FBI investigation of Michael Flynn as Strozok appears somewhat contradictory in his evaluation of Flynn as cooperative in demeanor but “repeatedly and inexplicably” lying on other issues.  Green most strongly criticized Strzok for his glossing over his extensive and ultimately destructive relationship with Lisa Page, as they were believed to have sent over 20,000 emails to each other, including the fatal ones that were used to show he had a bias against Donald Trump.  It is another instance of contradiction that the Compromised author is most criticized for by Lozada of the Post.  Strozok is seen as naive for not realizing his own philandering and unprofessional texting with a co-worker would lead to his own demise, while remaining aware that Trump's own philandering behavior and questionable financial dealings might lead to Trump's demise through future prosecution.

See also

 Hillary Clinton email controversy
 Peter Strzok
 The Case for Impeachment
 Dezinformatsia: Active Measures in Soviet Strategy
 Disinformation
 The KGB and Soviet Disinformation
 Steele dossier
 Timeline of Russian interference in the 2016 United States elections and Timeline of Russian interference in the 2016 United States elections (July 2016–election day)
 Trump: The Kremlin Candidate?
 Trump–Ukraine scandal

References

2020 non-fiction books
American non-fiction books
Books about Donald Trump
English-language books
Houghton Mifflin books
Criticism of Donald Trump
Books about United States legal history
Aftermath of the 2016 United States presidential election
American political books
Books about democracy
Books about politics of the United States
Books about the 2016 United States presidential election
Books about Russian interference in the 2016 United States elections